Lockport is a small unincorporated community in Manitoba, Canada. The community is split between the Rural Municipalities of St. Andrews (west of the river) and St. Clements (east of the river).

The Red River Floodway rejoins the Red River just down river from Lockport.  Lockport is also a popular angling location.

Lockport Provincial Park is located on the east bank of the river, where archeological studies have found evidence of human activity for 3,000 years.

Demographics 

St. Andrews Caméré Curtain Bridge Dam
The St. Andrews Caméré Curtain Bridge Dam, also known as the St. Andrews Lock and Dam, at Lockport was completed in 1910 in order to submerge the St. Andrews Rapids (a natural obstruction to the south) and make the Red River navigable through to Lake Winnipeg. Movable curtains are rolled back before winter freeze-up to prevent ice jams and allow flood waters to pass through unimpeded during the spring. A canal lock, the only one found in the Canadian prairies, allows river traffic to pass under the bridge.

The bridge above the dam, completed in 1913, connects Manitoba Highway 44 on either side of the river.

The St. Andrews Caméré Curtain Bridge Dam was designated a National Historic Site in 1990.  A monument and recreation area are located on the west bank of the Red River near the dam.

References

External links
Community website
RM of St. Andrews
Community profile

Designated places in Manitoba
Unincorporated communities in Manitoba